Donato Pascasio, O.S.B. Cel. (died 1664) was a Roman Catholic prelate who served as Bishop of Trevico (1646–1664).

Biography
Donato Pascasio was born in Castel Vecchio, Italy and ordained a priest in the Celestine Order of Saint Benedict.
On 9 April 1646, he was appointed during the papacy of Pope Innocent X as Bishop of Trevico.
On 22 April 1646, he was consecrated bishop by Pier Luigi Carafa (seniore), Cardinal-Priest of Santi Silvestro e Martino ai Monti, with Alfonso Sacrati, Bishop Emeritus of Comacchio, and Ranuccio Scotti Douglas, Bishop of Borgo San Donnino, serving as co-consecrators. 
He served as Bishop of Trevico until his death on 13 February 1664.

While bishop, he was the principal co-consecrator of Pietro Paolo Russo, Bishop of Nusco (1649).

References

External links and additional sources
 (for the Chronology of Bishops using non-Latin names) 
 (for the Chronology of Bishops using non-Latin names)  

17th-century Italian Roman Catholic bishops
Bishops appointed by Pope Innocent X
1664 deaths
Benedictine bishops
Celestine Order